The Kivalina River is a  river in the northwestern part of the U.S. state of Alaska, flowing into Kivalina Lagoon in the Northwest Arctic Borough. It begins in the De Long Mountains and flows southwest  through Kivalina Lagoon to the Chukchi Sea. Its Inuit name was spelled "Kuveleek" by Lieutenant G. M. Stoney, United States Navy, in 1885, and its present spelling was adopted in 1904.

The village of Kivalina is located on a reef at the mouth of the river.

See also
List of rivers of Alaska

References

Rivers of North Slope Borough, Alaska
Rivers of Northwest Arctic Borough, Alaska
Rivers of Alaska
Drainage basins of the Chukchi Sea